The men's hammer throw event at the 2014 African Championships in Athletics was held on August 13 on Stade de Marrakech.

Results

References

2014 African Championships in Athletics
Hammer throw at the African Championships in Athletics